

Events

January–March 
 January 1 – The Greek Constitution of 1822 is adopted by the First National Assembly at Epidaurus.
January 3 - The famous French explorer, Aimé Bonpland, is made prisoner in Paraguay accused of being a spy. 
 January 7 – The first group of freed slaves from the United States arrive on the west coast of Africa, founding Monrovia on April 25.
 January 9 – The Portuguese prince Pedro I of Brazil decides to stay in Brazil against the orders of the Portuguese King João VI, beginning the Brazilian independence process.
 January 13 – The design of the modern-day flag of Greece is adopted by the First National Assembly at Epidaurus, for their naval flag.
 January 14 – Greek War of Independence: Acrocorinth is captured by Theodoros Kolokotronis and Demetrios Ypsilantis.
 February 6 – Chinese junk Tek Sing sinks in the South China Sea, with the loss of around 1,600 people on board.
 February 9 – The invading Haitian forces, led by Jean-Pierre Boyer, arrive in Santo Domingo, to overthrow the newly founded Dominican Republic.
 February 24 – The first Swaminarayan temple, Kalupur Swaminarayan Mandir at Ahmedabad in the British Raj, is inaugurated.
 March 19 – The Holy Alliance sends the Ottoman Empire a final ultimatum after Ottoman repression of Austrian subjects in Bucharest during the Wallachian uprising, otherwise facing war with Austria.
 March 19 – Boston, Massachusetts, becomes a city following a vote.
 March 31 – Greek War of Independence – Chios massacre: 20,000 Greeks on the island of Chios are slaughtered by Ottoman troops, and 23,000 exiled.

April–June 
 April 25 – The American Colonization Society lands at Cape Mesurado on the West African coast, after purchasing  of coastline. The settlement will soon become Monrovia, as the nation of Liberia is established to fill the ACS mission of freeing black American slaves and sending them "back to Africa".
 April 30 – President of the Board of Control in the House of Commons, George Canning, moves to repeal a law that prohibited Roman Catholic peers from sitting or voting in the House of Lords; the motion passes, 235–223, on its second reading, but the House of Lords declines to pass it.
 May 16 - Nairs, the upper caste in British Raj,  attack Sandar women for covering their upper body and breasts.
 May 24 – Battle of Pichincha: Simón Bolívar secures the independence of Quito.
 May 25 – Christos Palaskas and Alexis Noutsos are executed by Odysseas Androutsos' forces.
 May 26 – Grue Church fire: 116 people are killed, in the biggest fire disaster in Norway's history.
 June 6 – Alexis St. Martin is accidentally shot in the stomach, which leads the way to William Beaumont's studies on digestion.
 June 18 – Greek War of Independence: Konstantinos Kanaris blows up the Ottoman navy's flagship at Chios, killing the Kapudan Pasha Nasuhzade Ali Pasha.

July–September 
 July 3 – Charles Babbage publishes a proposal for a difference engine, a forerunner of the modern computer, for calculating logarithms and trigonometric functions. Construction of an operational version will proceed under British Government sponsorship (1823–32), but it will never be completed.
 July 8 – The Chippewas turn over a huge tract of land in Ontario to the United Kingdom.
 July 13 – Greek War of Independence: Greeks defeat Ottoman forces at Thermopylae.
 July 26 – Guayaquil Conference: José de San Martín arrives in Guayaquil, Ecuador, to meet with Simón Bolívar.
 July 27 – Guayaquil Conference: Simón Bolívar and General José de San Martín meet in Guayaquil, which Bolívar later annexes.
 July 31 – The last public whipping is carried out in Edinburgh.
 August 5–13 – An 1822 earthquake sequence occurs in the northern part of the Ottoman Empire, causing severe damage from Gaziantep to Antakya in modern Turkey and from Aleppo to Khan Sheikhun in modern Syria. At least 20–30,000 people are killed.
 August 12 
 British Foreign Secretary Lord Castlereagh commits suicide at his house in Kent. He is judged to have been insane at the time.
 St David's College (the modern-day University of Wales, Lampeter) is founded in Wales by Thomas Burgess, Bishop of St David's.
 August 15–29 – The Visit of King George IV to Scotland takes place.
 August 22 – English ship Orion lands at Yerba Buena, now named San Francisco, under the command of William A. Richardson.
 September 7 – Brazilian independence: Brazil declares its independence from Portugal.
 September 8–13 – Battle of Nauplia: In a series of naval engagements, the Ottoman Fleet fails to break through the Greek Fleet, under Admiral Andreas Vokos Miaoulis.
 September 11 – Galileo Galilei's Dialogue Concerning the Two Chief World Systems (1632) is permitted by the Roman Catholic Church to be published.
 September 16
 George Canning is appointed British Secretary of State for Foreign Affairs.
 The Constituent Congress of Peru begins its first session.
 September 22 – Portugal approves its first Constitution.
 September 27 – Jean-François Champollion announces his success in deciphering Egyptian hieroglyphs, using the Rosetta Stone, in a letter to the Académie des Inscriptions et Belles-Lettres in Paris (based on the work of Thomas Young).

October–December 
 October 8 – The Galunggung volcano erupts on West Java, and is followed four days later by a second, more violent outburst; the two events kill more than 4,000 people and destroy 114 villages.
 October 12 – Pedro, Crown Prince of Portugal, is declared the constitutional Emperor of Brazil, as Pedro the First.
 October 31 – Emperor Agustín de Iturbide of the First Mexican Empire dissolves the country's Congress of the Union, and replaces it with a military junta.
 October–December – Congress of Verona: Russia, Austria and Prussia approve French intervention in Spain.
 November 9 – Action of 9 November 1822:  engages three pirate schooners off Cuba, as part of the West Indies anti-piracy operations of the United States.
 November 13
 Greek War of Independence: Nafplio falls to the Greek rebels.
 The Congregation of St. Basil founded in France.
 November 19 – An earthquake near Valparaíso, Chile, kills around 200, causes a tsunami and raises the coastal area.
 November 22 – A fire in Guangzhou (Canton) kills 500 people, and destroys 13,070 homes and several European-owned businesses.
 December 1 – Pedro I is crowned as the first Emperor of Brazil.

Date unknown 
 The Rocky Mountain Fur Company (Ashley's Hundred) leave from St. Louis, Missouri, setting off a major increase in fur trade.
 Coffee is no longer banned in Sweden.

Births

January–June 

 January 2 – Rudolf Clausius, German physicist (d. 1888)
 January 6
 Menyhért Lónyay, 5th Prime Minister of Hungary (d. 1884)
 Heinrich Schliemann, German archaeologist (d. 1890)
 January 9 – Carol Benesch, Silesian and Romanian architect (d. 1896)
 January 12  – Étienne Lenoir, Belgian engineer (d. 1900)
 January 25 – Charles Reed Bishop, American businessman, philanthropist in Hawaii (d. 1915)
 January 28 – Alexander Mackenzie, 2nd Prime Minister of Canada (d. 1892)
 February 4 – Edward Fitzgerald Beale, American Navy Lieutenant, explorer (d. 1893)
 February 16 – Sir Francis Galton, English biologist (d. 1911)
 c. March – Harriet Tubman (born Araminta Ross), African-American abolitionist, humanitarian and spy (d. 1913)
 March 14 – Teresa Cristina of the Two Sicilies, Empress consort of Brazil (d. 1889)
 April 3 – Edward Everett Hale, American writer (d. 1909)
 April 26 – Frederick Law Olmsted, American landscape architect (d. 1903)
 April 27 – Ulysses S. Grant, 18th President of the United States (d. 1885)
 May 3 – István Bittó, 7th Prime Minister of Hungary (d. 1903)
 May 18 – Mathew Brady, American photographer (d. 1896)
 May 20 – Frédéric Passy, French economist, recipient of the Nobel Peace Prize (d. 1912)
 May 26 – Edmond de Goncourt, French writer (d. 1896)
 May 11 – Henry Baker Tristram, English clergyman, ornithologist. (d. 1906)
 June 10 – John Jacob Astor III, American businessman (d. 1890)

July–December 

 July 4 – Jean-Baptiste Claude Eugène Guillaume, French sculptor (d. 1905)
 July 19 – Princess Augusta of Cambridge (d. 1916)
 July 20 – Gregor Mendel, Czech geneticist (d. 1884)
 July 21 – Elizabeth Herbert, Baroness Herbert of Lea, English Catholic writer, translator, philanthropist, and influential social figure (d. 1911)
 July 25 – Andrew Bryson, American admiral (d. 1892)
 August 27 – William Hayden English, American politician (d. 1896)
 September 22 – Avraamy Aslanbegov, Russian admiral and historian (d. 1900)
 October 4 – Rutherford B. Hayes, 19th President of the United States (d. 1893)
 October 6 – Benjamin F. Isherwood, American admiral, United States Navy Engineer-in-Chief (d. 1915)
 December 10 – César Franck, Belgian composer, organist (d. 1890)
 December 24 – Matthew Arnold, English poet (d. 1888)
 December 27 – Louis Pasteur, French microbiologist, chemist (d. 1895)

Deaths

January–June 
 January 10 – Bathilde d'Orléans, French princess (b. 1750)
 January 16 – Elisabeth Berenberg, German banker (b. 1749) 
 January 21 – Marie Aimée Lullin, Swiss entomologist (b. 1751) 
 January 24 – Ali Pasha of Yanina, ruler of European Turkey (b. 1741)
 February 10 – Prince Albert of Saxony, Duke of Teschen (b. 1738)
 February 20 – John "Walking" Stewart, English traveller, philosopher (b. 1747)
 February 24 – Thomas Coutts, British banker (b. 1735)
 February 27 – John Borlase Warren, British admiral (b. 1753)
 March 1 – Jack Jouett, American politician (b. 1754)
 March 16 – Jeanne-Louise-Henriette Campan, French educator, lady in waiting (b. 1752)
 March 19 – Valentin Haüy, French educator, founder of the first school for the blind (b. 1745)
 April 14 – Edmund Butcher, English Unitarian minister (b. 1757)
 April 20 – Allegra Byron, illegitimate daughter of Lord Byron (b. 1817)
 May 8 – John Stark, American Revolutionary War general (b. 1728)
 May 17 – Armand-Emmanuel de Vignerot du Plessis, Duc de Richelieu, Prime Minister of France (b. 1766)
 May 27 – Augustus, Duke of Saxe-Gotha-Altenburg (b. 1772)
 June 3
 Thomas Bulkeley, 7th Viscount Bulkeley, English aristocrat and politician (b. 1752)
 René Just Haüy, French "father of modern crystallography" (b. 1743)
 June 15 – Horatio Walpole, 2nd Earl of Orford (b. 1752)
 June 25 – E. T. A. Hoffmann, German Romantic author (b. 1776)

July–December 

 July 8 – Percy Bysshe Shelley, British poet (b. 1792)
 July 15 – Manuel Torres, first Colombian ambassador to the United States (b. 1762)
 August 4 – Kristjan Jaak Peterson, Estonian poet (b. 1801)
 August 12 – Robert Stewart, Viscount Castlereagh, British foreign secretary (suicide) (b. 1769)
 August 25 – William Herschel, German-born British astronomer (b. 1738)
 September 8 – Sophie de Condorcet, politically active French salonist, feminist (b. 1764)
 October 13 – Antonio Canova, Italian sculptor (b. 1757)
 October 16 – Eva Marie Veigel, Austrian-born English ballet dancer, known as La Violette (b. 1724)
 October 26 – Mahmud Dramali Pasha, Ottoman vizier (b. c. 1780)
 October 31 – Jared Ingersoll, U.S. presidential candidate (b. 1749)
 November 6 – Claude Louis Berthollet, French chemist (b. 1748)
 November 24 – Zofia Potocka, Greek-Polish noble and agent (b. 1760)
 November 26 – Karl August von Hardenberg, Prussian politician (b. 1750)
 December 7 – John Aikin, English doctor and writer (b. 1747)
 December 17 – Giovanni Fabbroni, Italian scientist (b. 1752)
 date unknown
 Manuela Medina, Mexican national heroine (b. 1780)
 Sara Oust, Norwegian lay minister (b. 1778)

References